The Pitta is a family of tropical birds.

Pitta may also refer to
Pitta (genus), a genus within the bird family
Pitta (surname)
Pitta (album), an album by Baek Ji-young
Pitta bread or pita bread
Pitta (island), an island of Greece
Pitta (dosha), one of the three doshas in Ayurveda

See also
Pita (disambiguation)
Pitta Pitta language, an extinct Australian Aboriginal language